Tunica Resorts, formerly known as Robinsonville until 2005, is a census-designated place (CDP) in northern Tunica County, Mississippi, United States, north of the county seat of Tunica. The community is situated mostly between the Mississippi River and U.S. Route 61 along the border with Arkansas. The population as of the 2020 census was 2,132.

Tunica Resorts is the site of six casino resorts, and at one time generated the third largest gambling revenues in the nation, after Las Vegas and Atlantic City, New Jersey, but competition has increased in other locations, including properties owned by Native American tribes and operated on their reservations. The use of the name "Tunica" by the resorts led to the alternative name of Tunica Resorts to make it easier for tourists to find the destination. The unincorporated community of Robinsonville is in the south-central part of the CDP. The Robinsonville post office, with ZIP code 38664, is the mailing address for the entire CDP.

History
In the first half of the 19th century, this area was developed as cotton plantations, part of what was considered the Mississippi Delta extending north to Memphis and south to Vicksburg. It depended on enslaved labor.

After emancipation, many African Americans continued to work in agriculture in this area. In the early decades of the 20th century, thousands of African Americans migrated north from Mississippi to Chicago and other industrial cities in the Great Migration to leave the violence and oppression of the South, as well as the loss of jobs due to mechanization of agriculture. Population also declined in the county as railroads and highways drew off traffic from the river.

After 1995, gambling casinos and resorts were developed in the unincorporated community of Robinsonville, north of the county seat of Tunica. In a nod to riverboat gambling, to comply with state law, the casinos are built on floating platforms in the Mississippi River.

Lacking the structure of an organized city or town, Tunica Resorts consists mainly of casinos and cotton fields, with few permanent residents living in the community.

Tunica Resorts has ranked as high as the third-largest casino-gambling destination in the United States, as measured by gaming revenue, behind Las Vegas, Nevada and Atlantic City, New Jersey. Its casinos attract gamblers mainly from nearby Memphis, but also draw visitors from Mississippi, Tennessee, Arkansas, Alabama, Missouri, Georgia, Illinois and Kentucky. In the second decade of the 21st century, due to increased legalization of gambling in other states, including on Native American reservations, Tunica places sixth in gaming revenue, after the Las Vegas Strip, Atlantic City, Chicago, Connecticut, and Detroit.

The 2011 Mississippi River floods damaged casino resort buildings and infrastructure in this community. While the casinos float and escaped most damage, the hotels' towers and surrounding businesses are on land. Some of the hotels had major flooding on the lower floors, including the Harrah's Casino Tunica, which was under nearly six feet of water.

Economy

As of 2021, the town is home to six casinos:
 1st Jackpot Casino Tunica
 Fitz Tunica Casino & Hotel 
 Gold Strike Casino Resort  
 Hollywood Casino Tunica 
 Horseshoe Casino Tunica
 Sam's Town Hotel and Gambling Hall
At one time, eleven different casinos were operated in the community. Resorts Casino Tunica, Tunica Roadhouse, Treasure Bay Casino and Grand Casino Tunica closed, and the Isle of Capri Casino Hotel Tunica (originally the first of three Harrah's locations in the area) was bought by the neighboring Sam's Town resort; it is used only for its hotel tower and parking garage.

The community is remarkable in that there is little infrastructure other than that which adjoins the casinos. Businesses other than the casinos include a small number of motels, convenience stores and fast food restaurants, along with an outlet-style shopping center, and the community's oldest business, the Hollywood Cafe, a blues club immortalized in the popular song, "Walking in Memphis," by Marc Cohn in 1991.

Small apartment complexes mainly occupied by casino workers are among the few dwellings found in Tunica Resorts. Outside of such structures — many built since 1990 — table-flat cotton fields mark much of the area, as was the case before the casinos came.

Demographics

2020 census

Arts and culture
In May 2008, the board of directors of the Mid-South Fair announced that the annual event would move to a new site in Robinsonville, on U.S. 61 across from the Tunica Visitors Center. The first fair on the new site was scheduled for 2009. However, mainly because of weather but also because of the poor economy, the fair was instead held at the DeSoto Civic Center, and will continue to be until the new fairgrounds site is ready.

Government

Beginning in 2007, some Robinsonville residents have tried to incorporate their community into a separate town government, rather than exist under the jurisdiction of Tunica County or move toward annexation into the town of Tunica. If Robinsonville incorporates, the new town government would be a direct beneficiary of casino tax revenue, enabling construction of municipal government offices. Depending on population and revenue growth, fire and police stations, a library and other public infrastructure could be other likely additions.

Education
Residents are a part of the Tunica County School District. Zoned schools include Robinsonville Elementary School, Tunica Middle School, and Rosa Fort High School.

Infrastructure

Fire department
Robinsonville is protected by the North Tunica County Fire Protection District, a career fire department that was created in 1997.

Notable people
Blues musician Robert Johnson spent much of his childhood on a cotton plantation in Robinsonville's Polk Place, and was schooled in the small, one-room wooden S. Peter's Church (long disappeared) in Indian Creek in the 1920s.

References

Census-designated places in Tunica County, Mississippi
Unincorporated communities in Tunica County, Mississippi
Gambling in Mississippi
Memphis metropolitan area
Census-designated places in Mississippi
Unincorporated communities in Mississippi